Tselinsky District is an administrative and municipal district (raion), one of the forty-three in Rostov Oblast, Russia. It is located in the south of the oblast. Its administrative center is the rural locality (a settlement) of Tselina. Population: 33,690 (2010 Census);  The population of Tselina accounts for 31.6% of the district's total population.

Notable residents 

Oleg Fatun (born 1959), sprinter

References

Notes

Sources

Districts of Rostov Oblast